Jacinto Lara International Airport  is an airport in Barquisimeto, Venezuela, named after Venezuelan independence hero Jacinto Lara. It serves the city of Barquisimeto and others such as Acarigua, Yaritagua, and Carora, the main cities in the west-central area of Venezuela.

It is one of the most important airports of Venezuela, and given its position in Venezuela, it has domestic flights to Caracas and international flights to Caribbean islands such as Hispaniola (to the Dominican Republic) and, formerly, to Curaçao and Aruba, and it had flights in the past to the United States (Barquisimeto is geographically closer to Miami than Caracas is). The airport was inaugurated in 1961; it has one terminal building with two levels, banks, restaurants, stores, taxi services, Wi-Fi service, and other services.

The runway length includes a  displaced threshold on Runway 27.

The Barquisimeto VOR-DME (Ident: BRM) is located on the field.

Airlines and destinations

See also
Transport in Venezuela
List of airports in Venezuela

References

External links
OpenStreetMap - Barquisimeto
OurAirports - Barquisimeto
SkyVector - Barquisimeto

Airports in Venezuela
Buildings and structures in Barquisimeto
Buildings and structures in Lara (state)